Philippe Starck (born 18 January 1949) is a French industrial architect and designer known for his wide range of designs, including interior design, architecture, household objects, furniture, boats and other vehicles.

Life
Starck was born on 18 January 1949 in Paris. He is the son of André Starck, who was an aeronautics engineer. He says that his father often inspired him because he was an engineer, who made invention a "duty". His family was originally from and lived in the Alsace region, before his grandfather moved to Paris. He studied at the École Camondo in Paris.

Career
While working for Adidas, Starck set up his first industrial design company, Starck Product, which he later renamed Ubik after Philip K. Dick's novel, and began working with manufacturers in Italy (Driade), Alessi, Kartell, and internationally, including Drimmer in Austria, Vitra in Switzerland and Disform in Spain.

In 1983, then-French President François Mitterrand, on the recommendation of his Minister of Culture, Jack Lang, chose Starck to refurbish the president's private apartments at the Élysée. The following year he designed the Café Costes.

Starck's output expanded to include furniture, decoration, architecture, street furniture, industry (wind turbines, photo booths), bathroom fittings, kitchens, floor, and wall coverings, lighting, domestic appliances, office equipment such as staplers, utensils, tableware, clothing, accessories, toys, glassware, graphic design and publishing, food, and vehicles for land, sea, air and space.

Architecture 

The buildings he designed in Japan, starting in 1989, went against the grain of traditional forms. The first, Nani Nani, in Tokyo, described as a biomorphic shed.
A year later he designed the Asahi Beer Hall in Tokyo, a building topped with a golden flame. This was followed in 1992 by Le Baron Vert office complex in Osaka. In France he designed the extension of the École Nationale Supérieure des Arts Décoratifs (ENSAD) in Paris (1998).

In 1991, Starck designed one of the pavilions for the new Groninger Museum.

Since the late 1980s, Starck has designed several hotels in different countries, these include the Royalton Hotel (1988) and the lobby of the Paramount Hotel (1990) in New York City, the Delano in Miami, the Hudson Hotel
and the Mondrian Hotel in West Hollywood, the Sanderson  the Saint Martin's Lane in London, Le Meurice renovations in 2016, the Royal Monceau (2010) as well as more recently the Hotel Brach (2018) and the Hotel 9Confidentiel (2018), in Paris. Also in France, in the South West, Philippe Starck designed La Co(o)rniche and Ha(a)itza hotels, both in Arcachon, near the Dune of Pilat. In 2019, Starck created the Lily of the Valley Hotel on the French Riviera and in 2020, opened La Réserve Eden au Lac Zurich.

Starck has designed several restaurants, including in the early years, the Café Costes (1984) in Paris, Manin (1985) in Tokyo, Theatron (1985) in Mexico City, Teatriz (1990) in Madrid or more recently several restaurants with the Alajmo brothers in Paris, Venice and Milan – Caffe Stern (2014), Amo (2016),  Gran Caffe Quadri (2018) and Amor (2019), La Réserve à la Plage in Saint Tropez with Michel Reybier Hospitality, The Avenue at Saks in New York in 2019.

The Alhondiga, a 43,000 square-meter culture and leisure venue in Bilbao designed by Starck, opened in 2010.

Starck also designed affordable and adjustable pre-fabricated P.A.T.H. houses.

Starck was commissioned by the Hilton Worldwide to create entirely a new hotel in Metz, France. Maison Heler is a phantasmagoric building topped by a traditional Alsatian house, a poetic symbol of the region that should open in 2021.

Yachts

In 2002 he designed Wedge Too, which was built by Feadship.

In 2004, commissioned by Russian Oligarch Andrey Melnichenko, Starck designed the Motor Yacht A and then in 2012 the A (sailing yacht) – one of the world's largest sailing yachts.
Starck designed the infrastructure for the Port Adriano harbour on the south-west bay of Palma de Mallorca, Mallorca and was artistic director for the interior. It opened in April 2012.

In 2008, he designed Steve Jobs's yacht Venus, which was launched in October 2012, just over a year after the death of Apple's founder. The yacht was built at Aalsmeer in the Netherlands.

Furniture 
Zartan, created for Magis in 2010, is a chair entirely made from natural material as bamboo, linen and hemp fiber, a non-toxic and biodegradable alternative to replace plastic.

In 2012, Starck released Broom for Emeco, an anti-waste chair made of materials collected in lumber and plastic plants factories.

Starck released Cassina Croque la pomme in 2019, a furniture collection for Cassina, entirely made from a vegan fabric, with apple leather.

For Salone del Mobile 2022, Dior Maison has invited Starck to reinterpret the timeless Médallion seat – dreaming up the Miss Dior chair, paying tribute to a distinct femininity with an elegant construction and virtuoso craftsmanship.

Technology

In 1996, Starck worked with Alain Mikli to launch Starck Eyes. Bought in 2013 by Luxottica, Starck Eyes becomes Starck Biotech Paris in 2019 and is inspired by the human body to create revolutionary eyewear, merging design with biomechanics.

Starck helped design the Xiaomi Mi MIX smartphone, notable for having a 6.4-inch "whole surface screen".

In 2016, Starck developed a GPS-tracking wristband, DIAL (Individual Alert and Localization Device) for Société nationale de Sauvetage en Mer, which allows endangered people to share their exact location to rescue service whether they are in the sea or in the beach.

In 2018, Starck collaborated with Axiom Space and created the interior of the International Space Station's housing module. A comfortable and luxurious living space adapted to weightlessness, with suede-textured walls, big windows to appreciate the view and all the technology needed to stay connected.

In 2019, the so-called AI chair was presented to the public. Starck cooperated with experts of the 3D software company Autodesk and created a chair design with help of an Artificial Intelligence.

Collections 
Starck's work is seen in the collections of European and American museums, including the Musée National d'Art Moderne (to which he has donated several pieces, in particular prototypes) the Musée des Arts Décoratifs in Paris, the MOMA and the Brooklyn Museum in New York City, the Vitra Design Museum in Basel and the Design Museum in London. More than 660 of his designs were inventoried in French public collections in 2011.

Philosophy

Democratic design
Starck's concept of democratic design led him to focus on mass-produced consumer goods rather than one-off pieces, seeking ways to reduce cost and improve quality in mass market goods.

Through his "democratic design" concept, Starck has campaigned for well-designed objects that are not just aimed for upper-tiered incomes. He has expressed this as a utopian ideal, approached in practice by increasing production quantities to cut costs and by using mail-order, via Les 3 Suisses. In 1998, Philippe Starck sets up the Good Goods catalogue with La Redoute, proposing 170 sustainable and respectful everyday life objects "for the future moral market". Later in 2000, driven by his desire to make design accessible for everyone, he works with Target Stores and proposes a collection of more than 50 exclusive and affordable products.

Starck released Ideas Box in 2011 for Bibliothèques Sans Frontières. These kit media libraries give the refugee populations access to culture and information. They can be installed anywhere around the world and provide screens, books, games, cameras etc.

Starck has been involved in the development of Fluocaril toothbrushes and Laguiole Knives.

Alongside his work, Starck partnered with Moustache Bikes for the M.A.S.S. (Mud, Asphalt, Sand and Snow). This is a portfolio of four e-bikes that use a Bosch electrical engine and battery pack.

In January 2013, Starck redesigned the Navigo travel pass.

Bibliography

References

External links

 Mobilier national (France): Philippe Starck

French designers
French industrial designers
Industrial designers
Product designers
Compasso d'Oro Award recipients
1949 births
Living people
Axiom Space
Businesspeople from Paris
People named in the Paradise Papers
French interior designers